Mong Nawng, Mong Naung or Mongnawng is a town in Shan State, Myanmar. It is located a few miles to the west of the Nam Pang river.

History
In British Burma Mong Nawng was the capital of Mongnawng State, one of the large Shan States. The town had a population of 693 in 1901.

More recently the area has been ravaged by conflicts between the Shan State Army-South (SSA-S) and the Burmese Army.

Beginning on 6 October 2015 a large scale offensive by the Tatmadaw comprising 20 Burma Army battalions has been launched in central Shan State. The aim of the military is to seize Shan ceasefire territories in Kehsi, Mong Hsu and Mong Nawng townships, using heavy artillery and with fighter jet and helicopter gunship air support to indiscriminately shell and bomb civilian areas. These attacks have displaced thousands of Shan, Palaung, Lisu and Lahu people causing a new humanitarian crisis.

References

External links
 Burma Army Shelling and Aerial Bombing of 6,000 Civilians in Mong Nawng Town are War Crimes
Rinderpest in Burma statistics

Populated places in Shan State
Township capitals of Myanmar